Set the Booty Up Right is a five-song  EP released by the ska/funk metal/rock band Fishbone in 1990. It was recorded shortly after the band hired former Miles Davis music director John Bigham on guitar and keyboard (though Bigham is not pictured in the band photo on the back cover of the CD). The EP served as a stopgap release for fans, due to production delays for the full album The Reality of My Surroundings, which was released in 1991. The EP features two alternate versions of the song "Bonin' in the Boneyard" (the original version of which is found on the 1988 album Truth and Soul) as well as three new studio tracks. It has long been out of print, but the track "Love and Bullshit" was included on the 1996 retrospective Fishbone 101: Nuttasaurusmeg Fossil Fuelin' the Fonkay.

Track listing

Personnel
Fishbone
John Bigham - keyboards, guitar
Chris Dowd - keyboards, trombone, vocals
Philip "Fish" Fisher - drums
John Norwood Fisher - bass guitar
Kendall Jones - guitar
Walter A. Kibby II - trumpet, vocals
Angelo Moore - saxophone, vocals
Technical
Carmen Rizzo - producer (track 1)
David Kahne - producer (tracks 2, 3 & 4)
The Jungle Brothers - producer (track 5)

Accolades

References

1990 EPs
Fishbone albums
Albums produced by David Kahne
Columbia Records EPs